The Oxalidaceae, or wood sorrel family, are a small family of five genera of herbaceous plants, shrubs and small trees, with the great majority of the 570 species in the genus Oxalis (wood sorrels). Members of this family typically have divided leaves, the leaflets showing "sleep movements", spreading open in light and closing in darkness.

The genus Averrhoa of which starfruit is a member, is usually included in this family (e.g. APG IV, 2016), but some botanists place it in a separate family Averrhoaceae.

References

External links 

 Oxalidaceae and Averrhoaceae in L. Watson and M.J. Dallwitz (1992 onwards). The families of flowering plants: descriptions, illustrations, identification, information retrieval. http://delta-intkey.com
 
 

 
Rosid families